Sergei Yevgenyevich Pankov (born 31 December 1978) is a former Russian professional football player.

Club career
He played 4 seasons in the Russian Football National League for FC Metallurg Lipetsk and FC Spartak Nizhny Novgorod.

References

1978 births
Living people
Russian footballers
Sportspeople from Kemerovo
Association football goalkeepers
FC Sibir Novosibirsk players
FC Metallurg Lipetsk players
FC Mordovia Saransk players
FC Spartak Nizhny Novgorod players